Bruce Maclean Hudson (November 13, 1928 – October 8, 2016) was a Canadian curler.

Hudson won two provincial men's championships as a skip, in 1964 and 1967. In 1964, he and teammates Harvey Mazinke, Ken Little and Harold Martel represented Manitoba at that year's Brier. The team would finish in third place overall, with a 7-3 record. Hudson represented Manitoba again at the 1967 Macdonald Brier, with teammates Dick Wright, Gordon Little and Martel. The team would finish in a tie for second place, with an 8-2 record. In 1981, Hudson won a provincial senior men's title with teammates Don McNeill, Jim Robertson and Ken Beatty.

Personal life
Hudson was the son of two-time Brier champion Gordon Hudson. He was a long-time member of the Knox United Church. In addition to his curling career, he was also an accomplished golfer and baseball player. He was inducted into the Manitoba Curling Hall of Fame in 1994 and the Manitoba Baseball Hall of Fame in 2003. He was married and had four children and was employed by the province of Manitoba.

References

1928 births
2016 deaths
Curlers from Winnipeg
Canadian male curlers
Members of the United Church of Canada
20th-century Canadian people